Richard Rodd (died before 1633), of Totnes, Devon and Rodd, Herefordshire, was a politician.

He was a Member (MP) of the Parliament of England for Totnes in 1621. He was Mayor of Totnes in 1612–13.

References

Year of birth missing
17th-century deaths
English MPs 1621–1622
Members of the Parliament of England (pre-1707) for Totnes
Mayors of Totnes
People from Herefordshire